Crivillén is a municipality in the Andorra-Sierra de Arcos comarca, province of Teruel, part of the autonomous community of Aragon, Spain. According to the 2010 census the municipality has a population of 93 inhabitants. Its postal code is 44557.

The sculptor Pablo Serrano spent his youth in Crivillén, and there is a museum on his honor.

See also
 Andorra-Sierra de Arcos
List of municipalities in Teruel

References

External links 

 Crivillén, CAI Aragon
Crivillén 
Crivillén's site from the people 

Municipalities in the Province of Teruel